The Windsor Clippers is a Canadian junior box lacrosse team and members of the Ontario Junior B Lacrosse League of the Ontario Lacrosse Association.  The team, from Windsor, Ontario, Canada, was known as the Windsor AKO Fratmen from 2003 until 2009 as they were sponsored by the AKO Fraternity.

History

The team made its expansion debut in the OLA Jr. "B" league in 2003.  The team's first win was on April 30, 2003, against Wallaceburg, 21–12.  In four completed seasons, the team has never failed to make the playoffs.  The Fratmen hosted the 2005 Junior "B" All-Star Game, and in the team's fourth season Windsor hosted the 2006 Founders Cup.  The Fratmen's first ever playoff victory came against the Six Nations Red Rebels in the 2005 Conference Semi-final.  On July 2, 2005, the Fratmen defeated Six Nations in the first game of the series 6–4.  Their first playoff round victory came in the 2006 Conference Semi-final against the Owen Sound Rams, 3-games-to-1.

At the 2005 All-Star Game in Windsor, Ontario, it was announced that the AKO Fratmen would host the 2006 Founders Cup Tournament.

At the 2006 Founders Cup on August 23, the Fratmen opened up the tournament with a 20–9 dismantling of the Nova Scotia Knights.  Later that night, the Fratmen also beat the Langley Thunder 11–4.  On August 24, the Fratmen topped the Edmonton Warriors by a score of 11–7.  On August 25, AKO beat the Iroquois Lacrosse Association (a team composed mostly of players from Kahnawake, Quebec) by a score of 12–8.  The victory clinched first place and a bye to the semi-final for the Fratmen, as both teams were undefeated (3–0) going into the game.  Jamie Pillon lead all round robin scoring with 22 points (9 goals, 13 assists), he was closely followed by the Andrew Ryckman (6 goals, 15 assists) and 2005 OLA Most Valuable Player David Hodgins (9 goals, 12 assists).

In the Semi-final on August 26, the Fratmen took on their most competitive opponent of the tournament to date, the Iroquois Lacrosse Association, for the second time.  They came out on top again with a tight 6–3 victory.  The Fratmen faced the OLA Champion Oakville Buzz in the Founders Cup Final.  The Fratmen (5–0) and Buzz (4–0) were the only two undefeated teams left in the tournament at the time, and had not played against each other in the season.

On August 27, the AKO Fratmen played in the National Championship Game against the Oakville Buzz.  The Fratmen and Buzz were tied 1–1 after the first period.  The second saw the Buzz come alive, at the end leading by a score of 5–2.  In the third, the Buzz blew the game wide open.  The final score was 10–4, but the Fratmen held tough until the end.  Cam Brown was named the Fratmen's Game MVP, while both Jamie Pillon and Matt Soulliere were named to the Founders Cup All-Star Team.

Clippers
In Fall 2013, the Canadian Lacrosse Association honoured long-time general manager and co-founder of the team Mike Soulliere with an award for his dedication to the development of the sport.

Season-by-season results
Note: GP = Games played, W = Wins, L = Losses, T = Ties, Pts = Points, GF = Goals for, GA = Goals against

Founders Cup
CANADIAN NATIONAL CHAMPIONSHIPS

Team awards
Far-West Division Champions: 2005, 2006, 2007, 2008, 2009, 2010, 2011, 2013, 2014, 2015, 2016, 2017, 2018, 2019
Western Conference Regular Season Champions: 2009
Marlene Soulliere Trophy Western Conference Playoffs Champions: 2022
Founders Cup Silver Medallists: 2006

Individual awards
2003 OLA Western Rookie of the Year - David Hodgins
2004 OLA Western Most Sportsmanlike Player - David Rivait
2005 OLA Western Most Valuable Player - David Hodgins
2005 OLA Western Scoring Champion - David Hodgins (93 pts)
2006 CLA Founders Cup All-star team - Jamie Pillon & Matt Soulliere
2007 OLA Western Most Sportsmanlike Player - Andrew Ryckman
2009 OLA Western Scoring Champion - Brett Hickey (72 pts)
2009 OLA Western Coaching Staff of the Year - Greg Ducharme, Ron Martinello, Les Boomer, Eddie McGaffey and company
2012 OLA Western Rookie of the Year - Lucas Ducharme
2013 CLA Achievement Award - Mike Soulliere (GM & President)
2014 OLA Western & League Scoring Champion - Brendon Anger (111 pts)
2015 OLA Western Scoring Champion - Logan Holmes (113 pts)
2015 OLA Western Most Sportsmanlike Player - Dylan Riley
2016 OLA Western & League Scoring Champion - Logan Holmes (145 pts)
2017 WESPY Mickey Renaud Captain's Award - Logan Holmes
2017 OLA Western & League Scoring Champion - Andrew Garant (146 pts)
2018 WESPY Male Athlete of the Year Award - Andrew Garant
2018 WESPY Knobby Knudsen Volunteer of the Year Award - Jim Morgan
2018 OLA Western & League Scoring Champion - Chase Kavanaugh (122 pts)
2018 OLA Western Most Valuable Player - Chase Kavanaugh
2018 OLA Western Rookie of the Year - Brayden Mayea
2019 OLA Western Rookie of the Year - Zane Dalpe
2022 OLA Western Most Valuable Player - Zane Dalpe
2022 OLA Best Goaltenders Award - Chase Cosgrove/Griffin Salaris
2022 OLA Creator's Game Award - Mike Soulliere (GM & President)

Professional alumni
Brett Hickey (San Diego Seals)
Josh Jubenville (Toronto Rock)
Kellen LeClair (Calgary Roughnecks)
Liam LeClair (Calgary Roughnecks)
Dylan Riley (Rochester Knighthawks)

NLL Entry Draft picks
2011 Brett Hickey 5th Rd - 43rd Overall to Washington Stealth
2015 Kellen Leclair 3rd Rd - 25th Overall to Calgary Roughnecks (by way of Six Nations Arrows)
2016 Logan Holmes 6th Rd - 52nd Overall to Buffalo Bandits
2017 Josh Jubenville 4th Rd - 40th Overall to Toronto Rock (by way of Six Nations Arrows)
2017 Andrew Garant 6th Rd - 56th Overall to Vancouver Stealth
2018 Dylan Riley - 5th Rd - 62nd Overall to Rochester Knighthawks (by way of Davenport Panthers)
2019 Liam Leclair - 1st Rd - 7th Overall to Calgary Roughnecks (by way of Six Nations Arrows)
2021 Patrick Kaschalk - 1st Rd - 16th Overall to Albany FireWolves (by way of Burlington Chiefs)
2021 Will Cecile - 2nd Rd - 32nd Overall to Georgia Swarm (by way of Burlington Chiefs)
2022 Chase Cosgrove - 3rd Rd - 52nd Overall to Vancouver Warriors

References

External links

Ontario Lacrosse Association

Ontario Lacrosse Association teams
Sport in Windsor, Ontario
2003 establishments in Ontario
Lacrosse clubs established in 2003